Torkel Franzén (1 April 1950, Norrbotten County – 19 April 2006, Stockholm) was a Swedish academic.

Biography
Franzén worked at the Department of Computer Science and Electrical Engineering at Luleå University of Technology, Sweden, in the fields of mathematical logic and computer science. He was known for his work on Gödel's incompleteness theorems and for his contributions to Usenet. He was active in the online science fiction fan community, and even issued his own electronic fanzine Frotz on his fiftieth birthday.  He died of bone cancer at age 56.

Selected works 
 Gödel's Theorem: An Incomplete Guide to its Use and Abuse. Wellesley, Massachusetts: A K Peters, Ltd., 2005. x + 172 pp. .
 Inexhaustibility: A Non-Exhaustive Treatment. Wellesley, Massachusetts: A K Peters, Ltd., 2004. Lecture Notes in Logic, #16, Association for Symbolic Logic. .
 The Popular Impact of Gödel's Incompleteness Theorem, Notices of the American Mathematical Society, 53, #4 (April 2006), pp. 440–443.
 Provability and Truth (Acta universitatis stockholmiensis, Stockholm Studies in Philosophy 9) (1987)

See also 
 Gödel's incompleteness theorems

References

External links 
 Home page
 Raatikainen, Panu. Review of Gödel's Theorem: An Incomplete Guide to Its Use and Abuse. Notices of the American Mathematical Society, Vol. 54, No. 3 (March 2007), pp. 380–3.

1950 births
2006 deaths
Usenet people
20th-century Swedish mathematicians
21st-century Swedish mathematicians
Mathematical logicians
Academic staff of the Luleå University of Technology